The Jacobus Kapteyn Telescope or JKT is a 1-metre optical telescope named for the Dutch astronomer Jacobus Kapteyn (1851-1922) of the Isaac Newton Group of Telescopes at the Roque de los Muchachos Observatory on La Palma in the Canary Islands, Spain.

Funded jointly by the Netherlands and the United Kingdom with planning throughout the 1970s, construction of the JKT was completed in 1983 with the first photographic plate taken in March 1984. It can be used with two different focal points and different instruments, although by 1998 this was refined to one CCD imaging instrument. The telescope weighs nearly 40 metric tons in total.

Being superseded by more recent and larger telescopes, it was taken out of service as a common-user facility in August 2003. 

Since 2014, the telescope is owned by the Instituto de Astrofísica de Canarias (IAC) and operated by the Southeastern Association for Research in Astronomy (SARA) which has retrofitted JKT as a remotely operated observatory (under the internal designation SARA-RM), with the first new observations in this regime in April 2016.

Timeline 
Summary:

1984-2003 ING
 2003-2014 occasional project use
 January 2014, IAC ownership
 2015, resumed operations as robotic telescope for SARA

Views

See also 
 List of largest optical telescopes in the 20th century

References

External links 
 The Isaac Newton Group of Telescopes (ING) JKT Page
 The Southeastern Association for Research in Astronomy (SARA)
 Instituto de Astrofísica de Canarias (IAC)

Optical telescopes
Astronomical observatories in La Palma